Zelyonaya Polyana is a rural locality (a village) in Tashbulatovsky Selsoviet, Abzelilovsky District, Bashkortostan, Russia. The population was 136 as of 2010. There are 25 streets.

Geography 
Zelyonaya Polyana is located 42 km north of Askarovo (the district's administrative centre) by road. Kusimovskogo rudnika is the nearest rural locality.

References 

Rural localities in Abzelilovsky District